The 2000 Western Athletic Conference men's basketball tournament was held March 9–11 at the Selland Arena at Fresno State University in Fresno, California. 

Hosts Fresno State upset top-seeded Tulsa in the championship game, 75–72, to clinch their first WAC men's tournament championship. However, most of the Bulldogs' season was later vacated by the NCAA for using an ineligible player.

Fresno State received the WAC's automatic bid to the 2000 NCAA tournament. They were joined in the tournament by WAC regular season champion Tulsa, who earned an at-large bid.

Format
Prior to the 1999–2000 season, eight of the WAC's members announced they were departing to form the new Mountain West Conference: Air Force, BYU, Colorado State, UNLV, New Mexico, San Diego State, Utah, and Wyoming. With this dramatic departure, the league was left with only eight teams. The tournament field was subsequently reduced from twelve to eight, and the division structure was eliminated.

All teams now qualified for the tournament and were all placed into the initial quarterfinal round. The teams were seeded based on regular season conference record.

Bracket

See also
WAC men's basketball tournament

References

WAC men's basketball tournament
Tournament
WAC men's basketball tournament
WAC men's basketball tournament